Protemus is an unincorporated community in Obion County, Tennessee, United States.

References 

Unincorporated communities in Obion County, Tennessee
Unincorporated communities in Tennessee